The Eagle River is a river in the Canadian province of British Columbia.

The river was named by Walter Moberly after following the flight of eagles and finding Eagle Pass.

Course
The Eagle River originates in the mountains west of Revelstoke and flows west and southwest, entering Shuswap Lake at Sicamous. The Eagle River is part of the Fraser River drainage basin, via the Thompson River. The Perry River is a major tributary, joining Eagle River near Malakwa.

See also
List of British Columbia rivers

References

Rivers of British Columbia